CPhos is a phosphine ligand derived from biphenyl.  It is a white solid that is soluble in organic solvents.

Its palladium complexes exhibit high activity for Negishi coupling reactions involving aryl bromides, chlorides and triflates. CPhos mediated reactions performed with secondary (sp3) alkylzinc halides often give excellent yields, with low conversion to the frequently encountered primary substituted by-products.

Utility in Negishi Coupling

A simplified scheme showing the reaction course of isopropylzinc bromide with an aryl halide is shown below. Processes leading to byproduct formation are highlighted in red.

Oxidative addition (1) of the aryl halide to the palladium-ligand complex followed by transmetalation (2) gives intermediate B which can undergo reductive elimination (3) to afford the desired isopropyl arene C.
However, intermediate B can also undergo β-hydride elimination (4) to afford D, which can either reductively eliminate (3’) to afford de-halogenated product G, or undergo insertion (5) leading to the formation of E. Once formed, E may also undergo reductive elimination (3’’) to afford the n-propyl by-product F.

CPhos minimises the conversion to undesired products F & G by increasing the rate of the reductive elimination of B, relative to the rate of β-hydride elimination.

See also
 Negishi coupling
 XPhos
 SPhos
 Dialkylbiaryl phosphine ligands

References

External links 
 CPhos at Sigma Aldrich
 CPhos Pd G2 (precatalyst) at Sigma Aldrich
 CPhos Pd G3 (precatalyst) at Sigma Aldrich

Tertiary phosphines